Ivo Ricardo Abreu Vieira (born 10 January 1976) is a Portuguese former footballer who played as a defender, currently head coach of Brazilian club Cuiabá.

He spent his entire playing career with Nacional, where he also began his managerial career in 2011. He managed six other clubs in the Primeira Liga.

Playing career
Vieira was born in Machico, Madeira. His entire ten-year professional career was spent with local C.D. Nacional, which he represented in all three major levels since being promoted to the main squad at the age of 18; during his tenure, he also acted as captain.

From 2002 to 2004, Vieira competed in the Primeira Liga. His first game in the competition took place on 22 September 2002, as he came on a last-minute substitute in a 2–0 away win against S.C. Beira-Mar; in the latter season, he contributed 19 appearances to help his team to a best-ever fourth position.

Coaching career
After retiring at the age of only 28, Vieira started working as a coach, first being named assistant manager at Nacional under Casemiro Mior. On 14 March 2011, after a spell with the club's juniors, he was handed the reins of the first team after Predrag Jokanović was fired. However, he himself was replaced by Pedro Caixinha at the end of October.

On 20 January 2013, Vieira was announced as the new manager of C.S. Marítimo B, the reserves of Nacional's local rivals. In early March 2015, after Leonel Pontes' resignation, he was appointed his successor at the helm of the first team, leading the club to the final of the Taça da Liga the following month later after disposing of FC Porto in the last-four stage; he resigned on 18 January 2016, due to poor results.

On 27 May 2016, Vieira was appointed at Segunda Liga club C.D. Aves for one year. He left on 15 February 2017, with the team nine points clear in the second promotion place after a run of one point from four games.

Vieira became manager of Académica de Coimbra in May 2017, stating his aim to end their exile from the top flight. He left in November with the side in sixth and took the helm at G.D. Estoril Praia, leaving after their top-division relegation.

On 28 May 2018, Vieira signed a one-year deal at Moreirense FC. He left at the end of this contract, having taken the team from Moreira de Cónegos to a best-ever sixth place, and in June 2019 he was hired by neighbours Vitória SC. After finishing seventh in his only season, he announced a sabbatical to spend time with his family.

Vieira was appointed as the manager of Al Wehda Club in the Saudi Professional League on 10 September 2020. He left by mutual consent the following 2 February, with the side in 10th.

On 8 March 2021, Vieira returned to his country's top flight with F.C. Famalicão. He signed a contract of undisclosed length at the club, who were second-from-bottom with 11 games remaining. His team were in contention for a UEFA Europa Conference League place on the final day of the season, eventually missing out but finishing 9th.

Vieira was dismissed on 19 December 2021, having taken 11 points from 15 games and with Famalicão in 16th. The following 28 June, he replaced Ricardo Soares at Gil Vicente F.C. on a two-year deal. He was removed from his post on 2 November after four consecutive defeats.

On 8 December 2022, Vieira replaced his compatriot António Oliveira at the helm of Campeonato Brasileiro Série A side Cuiabá Esporte Clube.

Managerial statistics

See also
List of one-club men

References

External links

1976 births
Living people
People from Machico, Madeira
Portuguese footballers
Association football defenders
Primeira Liga players
Liga Portugal 2 players
Segunda Divisão players
C.D. Nacional players
Portuguese football managers
Primeira Liga managers
Liga Portugal 2 managers
C.D. Nacional managers
C.S. Marítimo managers
C.D. Aves managers
Associação Académica de Coimbra – O.A.F. managers
G.D. Estoril Praia managers
Moreirense F.C. managers
Vitória S.C. managers
F.C. Famalicão managers
Gil Vicente F.C. managers
Saudi Professional League managers
Al-Wehda Club (Mecca) managers
Campeonato Brasileiro Série A managers
Cuiabá Esporte Clube managers
Portuguese expatriate football managers
Expatriate football managers in Saudi Arabia
Expatriate football managers in Brazil
Portuguese expatriate sportspeople in Saudi Arabia
Portuguese expatriate sportspeople in Brazil